The Liberal Student Clubs (CSL) are the student organisations of the National Liberal Party (PNL) of Romania. They have representation at the national level, National Coordinating Office, president Radu Surugiu, CSL organisations are found in all university cities (centre universitare) like Timișoara, Iaşi, Cluj-Napoca, Pitești, and Bucharest.

External links
 Liberal Student Clubs official site

Student Clubs
Student wings of political parties in Romania
Student wings of liberal parties